Visa requirements for crew members are administrative entry restrictions imposed by countries on members of the crew during transit or turnaround.

These requirements for permission to enter a territory for a short duration and perform their predefined duties in the given areas are distinct from actual formal permission for an alien to enter and remain in a territory.

The validity of transit visas for crew members are usually limited to short terms such as several hours to 10 days depending on the size of the country and the circumstances. Visa policies for crew members are set by the country and apply during transit or when joining the vessel or aircraft. It is usually illegal for crew members to perform repairs or do similar work without work permits when either in port, or when travelling in territorial waters. A few countries offer a visa waiver program or do not issue a crew  visa, but allow entry for a limited time with mandatory clearance documents.

Overview
An application for a crew visa in advance of arrival may afford non-citizens clearance to enter a country and to remain there within specified constraints and regions without a prohibition on employment. They are usually required to enter or exit the country with the aircraft, train or ship they work with. Many countries require crew to obtain relevant crew visas, so crew often carry second passports allowing the first to be submitted for visas, while the second passport is a backup held ready in case of a trip at short notice. Crew can obtain visas directly from embassies; however, many companies have a 3rd-party provider that shorten the application process for multi-entry visas. Pilots, seamen, air hostesses, flight attendants, stewards, or employees on board a ship whose services is required for normal operation.

Visa requirements

Non-visa restrictions

References

crew members